Pitch Slapped is a reality show on Lifetime. It premiered on January 5, 2016. It follows a cappella teams from two New Jersey high schools that are mentored by some of the best coaches in the industry as they face off in weekly competitions, leading up to a championship sing-off. Cherry Hill's Stay Tuned learns under the tutelage of Deke Sharon—who was the on-site music director for the Pitch Perfect films—while singer and performance coach Diana Preisler guides Highlands Voices as they prep for their performances.

Groups

Highlands Voices
One of the two groups featured on the show. Coached by Diana Preisler. They are one of the top groups locally and win wherever they go, even nationals. They feel as if they are in a rut and choose Diana to guide them with their performances.

Seniors: Andrew, Blue, Dan, Maddie, Philip, Vanessa, Neftali
Freshman: Mariela

Stay Tuned
One of the two groups featured on the show. Coached by Deke Sharon. They are the underdogs and call themselves "Stay Second" because they seem to always fall short to Highlands Voices. Unlike most a cappella groups, they have 21 members. They choose Deke to help them finally overcome their rivals.

Seniors: Paulina, Nicole, Casey, Megan, Phoebe, Brielle, Ibinye, Amrita, Nick
Juniors: Jack, David "D-Kahn", Sam, Winnie, Abigail, Sergio, Chris "Cha", Tarryl
Sophomores: Ashley, Cedric, Adam, Justin

Guest Groups
Vocal Forte & Unaccompanied Minors

Judges
Joan Bujacich, MEANJ President helped organize the judges for the majority of the episodes. Judges included Joan Bujacich, Joseph Bilotti, Lisa Gonzalez, Kathy Knittel, Diana Hessinger, Yuka Yanagi, Jeff Seitz, amir Mortezai, Dr. Frances Covalesky, and Adjunct College Music Professor.

Week One
No guests. Highlands Voices and Stay Tuned were head-to-head.

Week Two 
The Rolling Tones: A group featured in Season 1, Episode 2 "Will They Stay Two?". Went head-to-head with Highlands Voices.
Chock Full of Notes: A group featured in Season 1, Episode 2 "Will They Stay Two?". Went head-to-head with Stay Tuned.

Week Three
Vocal Forte: A group featured in Season 1, Episode 3, "This is Aca-War!". Went head-to-head with Highlands Voices.

SounXplosion: A group featured in Season 1, Episode 3, "This is Aca-War!". Went head-to-head with Stay Tuned. *Not including the seniors.

Episodes

Season 1 (2016)

Performances

Season 1 (2016)

References

External links
 Pitch Slapped Facebook
 Highland Voices Facebook
 Pitch Slapped on TV.com

2016 American television series debuts
2016 American television series endings
2010s American reality television series
2010s American high school television series
English-language television shows
Lifetime (TV network) original programming
Singing talent shows
Television series about teenagers
Television series by All3Media
Television shows set in New Jersey